Michael James McCaffrey (born April 11, 1946) is a former American football linebacker in the National Football League (NFL) who played for the Buffalo Bills. He played college football at University of California.

References 

1946 births
Living people
Players of American football from Bakersfield, California
American football linebackers
California Golden Bears football players
Buffalo Bills players